Alfie Dennen is a British creative technologist, Artist, and founder of several prominent websites dedicated to social activism.

Projects 
Dennen co-founded the mobile blogging platform Moblog, formerly MoblogUK, in November 2003. Commercial users of the service have included Ronan Keating, Bloc Party, Greenpeace, Elbow, Imogen Heap, Max Clifford, Channel 4, Oxfam, Amnesty International and Comic Relief. The service gained prominence in 2005 when Eliot Ward uploaded a photo to the site from one of the London Underground bombings.

Dennen responded to the terrorist attacks on London's public transport system by creating the website We're Not Afraid. The site's message was one of a public uniting against terrorism by refusing to sacrifice freedom in response to fear. Within days of the bombings, around 3,500 images had been submitted to the site. The site was the subject of a BBC documentary and coverage included Sky News, Channel 5, ABC World News Tonight and The New York Times.

Dennen's Stopped Clocks project attempts to collate images of stopped public clocks and campaign to get them working again. The campaign has featured on BBC News, London Tonight and The One Show.

In 2008, Dennen launched two art projects involving the creation of map-based images using mobile photography and GPS tracking. The first, in October 2008, was a treasure hunt around London to find photographs by James Nachtwey. Run in conjunction with the think tank Demos and XDRTB.org, the competition raised awareness of XDRTB.

The second project, Britglyph, invited people from across the UK to build a nationwide geoglyph, placing rocks at specific locations around the country and uploading photos of themselves doing so. The image was based on John Harrison's chronometer.

On 31 August 2012 Dennen re-launched the Big Art Mob project and was given control of the project from previous administrators Channel 4. The Big Art Mob in its new incarnation shifted focus from mapping the United Kingdom's public art to mapping the whole world's.

Awards 
Moblog collaborated with Channel 4 on the Big Art Mob, which won the on the Move Award at the Royal Television Society Innovation Awards 2007. It was described as "a creative project that encourages almost everyone to get involved... a large-scale example of television production in your pocket. Anyone can become a contributor or commentator, as long as they’ve got a mobile camera phone." It also won the MediaGuardian's innovation award for community engagement in 2008. It also received 3 BAFTA nominations across the interactive and mobile categories in 2008.

Moblog also collaborated with ShoZu on Britglyph, which won the Experimental and Innovation Award at the Webbys 2009.

On 14 August 2009 the Arts Council and LOCOG announced that Dennen's Bus.Tops project, in collaboration with Paula Le Dieu, was Shortlisted for the London award in the Artists Taking The Lead Public Art competition. The project was awarded a £5,000 development grant to further develop the project in competition with 4 other shortlisted artists for a £500,000 award to create a new work of public art in London. On 22 October 2009 the Arts Council announced that the Bus-Tops project had won the competition.

See also
Big Art Mob
Bus-Tops
Britglyph
We're Not Afraid

References

External links 
 Big Art Mob Site
 Bus Tops Site
 Alfie Dennen on Twitter
 Stopped Clocks site
 Evil Corp Boardgame website

Living people
British businesspeople
British artists
2012 Cultural Olympiad
Web designers
Year of birth missing (living people)
Place of birth missing (living people)